Blitz is the surname of:

Andy Blitz (born 1971), writer, actor and comedian
Anne Dudley Blitz (1881–1951), Dean of Women at the University of Minnesota (1923–1949)
David Blitz, philosopher
Maurice Blitz (1891–1975), Belgian Olympic water polo player
Gérard Blitz (entrepreneur) (1912–1990), founder of Club Med
Gérard Blitz (swimmer) (1901–1979), swimming and waterpolo Olympic medalist
Jeffrey Blitz, American film director and screenwriter
Jekuthiel Blitz, translator of Bible into Yiddish 1678
Johnny Blitz, punk rock drummer
Julien Paul Blitz (1885–1951), Belgian-American conductor
Phil Blitz (born 1984), professional wrestler
Rayner Blitz (born 1968), cricketer
Simon Blitz, British entrepreneur
Urban Blitz (born 1951), British rock musician

Surnames from nicknames
German-language surnames